John Walsh (1842 – 13 February 1893) was a politician in Queensland, Australia. He was a Member of the Queensland Legislative Assembly.

Early life 
Walsh was born in Oughterard, County Galway, Ireland. He married Margaret Jane Clohesy on 28 December 1867.

Career 
Walsh was a storekeeper in Cooktown, Queensland, 1874–79, and a storekeeper in Smithfield, Cairns, 1877. He became Mayor of Cooktown, 1876–77. He represented the electoral district of Cook from 5 December 1878 to 30 October 1883. As member for Cook he lobbied  for a rail link to Cooktown to support the gold mining in the district.

He went on to become a railway contractor and investor in New South Wales, 1884.

Later life 
Walsh died on 13 February 1893 in Randwick, Sydney. His funeral was held at Our Lady of the Sacred Heart Catholic Church in Randwick after which he was buried in Waverley Cemetery.

References

Members of the Queensland Legislative Assembly
1842 births
1893 deaths
19th-century Australian politicians